Elmrock is an unincorporated community in Knott County, Kentucky, United States. Elmrock had a post office from August 9, 1911, to September 2, 1989. The community was named for a large elm tree and large rock in the town.

References

Unincorporated communities in Knott County, Kentucky
Unincorporated communities in Kentucky